David Paul Cronenberg  (born March 15, 1943) is a Canadian film director, screenwriter, and actor. He is a principal originator of the genre commonly known as body horror, with his films exploring visceral bodily transformation, infectious diseases, and the intertwining of the psychological, the physical and the technological. Cronenberg is best known for exploring these themes through sci-fi horror films such as Shivers (1975), Scanners (1981),  Videodrome (1983) and The Fly (1986), though he has also directed dramas, psychological thrillers and gangster films.

Cronenberg's films have polarized critics and audiences alike; he has earned critical acclaim and has sparked controversy for his depictions of gore and violence. The Village Voice called him "the most audacious and challenging narrative director in the English-speaking world". His films have won numerous awards, including the Special Jury Prize for Crash at the 1996 Cannes Film Festival, a unique award that is distinct from the Jury Prize as it is not given annually, but only at the request of the official jury, who in this case gave the award "for originality, for daring, and for audacity".

From the 2000s to the 2020s, Cronenberg collaborated on several films with Viggo Mortensen, including A History of Violence (2005), Eastern Promises (2007), A Dangerous Method (2011) and Crimes of the Future (2022). Six of his films were selected to compete for the Palme d'Or, the most recent being Crimes of the Future, which was screened at the 2022 Cannes Film Festival.

Early life
Born in Toronto, Ontario, Cronenberg is the son of Esther ( Sumberg), a musician, and Milton Cronenberg, a writer and editor. He was raised in a "middle-class progressive Jewish family." His father was born in Baltimore, Maryland, and his mother was born in Toronto; all of his grandparents were Jews from Lithuania. They kept the Cronenberg household full of a wide variety of books, and Cronenberg's father tried to introduce him to art films such as The Seventh Seal, although at the time Cronenberg was more interested in western and pirate films, showing a particular affinity for those featuring Burt Lancaster.

A voracious reader from an early age, Cronenberg started off enjoying science fiction magazines like  The Magazine of Fantasy & Science Fiction, Galaxy, and Astounding, where he first encountered authors who would prove influential on his own work, including Ray Bradbury and Isaac Asimov, although he wouldn't encounter his primary influence, Philip K. Dick, until much later. Cronenberg also read comic books, noting his favorites were Tarzan, Little Lulu, Uncle Scrooge, Blackhawk, Plastic Man, Superman, and the original Fawcett Comics version of Captain Marvel, later known as Shazam. Although as an adult, Cronenberg feels superhero films are artistically limited, he maintains a fondness for Captain Marvel/Shazam, criticizing how he feels the character had been neglected. Cronenberg also read horror comics published by EC, which in contrast to the others, he described as "scary and bizarre and violent and nasty—the ones your mother didn’t want you to have."

Early films that later proved influential on Cronenberg's career include avant-garde, horror, science fiction, and thriller films, such as Un Chien Andalou, Vampyr, War of the Worlds, Freaks, Creature from the Black Lagoon, Alphaville, Performance, and Duel. However, Cronenberg has also cited less obvious films as influences, including comedies like The Bed Sitting Room, as well as Disney cartoons such as Bambi and Dumbo. Cronenberg said he found these two Disney animated films, as well as Universal's live-action Blue Lagoon, "terrifying" which influenced his approach to horror. Cronenberg went on to say that Bambi was the "first important film" he ever saw, citing the moment when Bambi's mother died as particularly powerful. Cronenberg even wished to screen Bambi as part of a museum exhibition of his influences,  but Disney refused him permission. In terms of conventional horror films that frightened him, Cronenberg cited Don't Look Now.

Cronenberg began writing as a child and did so constantly, mainly working in the science fiction genre. He attended high school at Harbord Collegiate Institute and North Toronto Collegiate Institute. A keen interest in science, especially botany and lepidopterology, led him to enter the Honours Science program at the University of Toronto in 1963, but he switched to Honours English Language and Literature later in his first year.

Cronenberg's fascination with the film Winter Kept Us Warm (1966), by classmate David Secter, sparked his interest in film. He began frequenting film camera rental houses, learning the art of filmmaking, and made two 16mm films (Transfer and From the Drain). Inspired by the New York underground film scene, he founded the Toronto Film Co-op with Iain Ewing and Ivan Reitman. After taking a year off to travel in Europe, he returned to Canada in 1967 and graduated from University College of the University of Toronto at the top of his class.

Career
After two short sketch films and two short art-house features (the black-and-white Stereo and the colour Crimes of the Future) Cronenberg went into partnership with Ivan Reitman. The Canadian government provided financing for his films throughout the 1970s. During this period, he focused on his signature "body horror" films such as Shivers  and Rabid, the latter of which provided pornographic actress Marilyn Chambers with work in a different genre, although Cronenberg's first choice for the role had been a then little-known Sissy Spacek. Rabid was a breakthrough with international distributors, and his next two horror features, The Brood and Scanners, gained stronger support. Even at this stage however, Cronenberg showed variety, by making Fast Company between The Brood and Rabid, a project reflecting his interest in car racing and bike gangs.

Cronenberg has cited William S. Burroughs and Vladimir Nabokov as influences. Perhaps the best example of a film that straddles the line between his works of personal chaos and psychological confusion is Cronenberg's 1991 "adaptation" of Naked Lunch (1959), his literary hero William S. Burroughs' most controversial book. The novel was considered "unfilmable", and Cronenberg acknowledged that a straight translation into film would "cost 400 million dollars and be banned in every country in the world". Instead—much like in his earlier film, Videodrome—he consistently blurred the lines between what appeared to be reality and what appeared to be hallucinations brought on by the main character's drug addiction. Some of the book's "moments" (as well as incidents loosely based upon Burroughs' life) are presented in this manner within the film. Cronenberg stated that while writing the screenplay for Naked Lunch (1991), he felt a moment of synergy with Burroughs' writing style. He felt the connection between his screenwriting style and Burroughs' prose style was so strong, that he jokingly remarked that should Burroughs pass on, "I'll just write his next book."

Cronenberg has said that his films should be seen "from the point of view of the disease", and that in Shivers, for example, he identifies with the characters after they become infected with the anarchic parasites. Disease and disaster, in Cronenberg's work, are less problems to be overcome than agents of personal transformation. Of his characters' transformations, Cronenberg said, "But because of our necessity to impose our own structure of perception on things we look on ourselves as being relatively stable. But, in fact, when I look at a person I see this maelstrom of organic, chemical and electron chaos; volatility and instability, shimmering; and the ability to change and transform and transmute." Similarly, in Crash (1996), people who have been injured in car crashes attempt to view their ordeal as "a fertilizing rather than a destructive event". In 2005, Cronenberg publicly disagreed with Paul Haggis' choice of the same name for the latter's Oscar-winning film Crash (2004), arguing that it was "very disrespectful" to the "important and seminal" J.G. Ballard novel on which Cronenberg's film was based.

Aside from The Dead Zone (1983) and The Fly (1986), Cronenberg has not generally worked within the world of big-budget, mainstream Hollywood filmmaking, although he has had occasional near misses. At one stage he was considered by George Lucas as a possible director for Return of the Jedi (1983) but was passed over. Cronenberg also worked for nearly a year on a version of Total Recall (1990), but experienced "creative differences" with producers Dino De Laurentiis and Ronald Shusett; a different version of the film was eventually made by Paul Verhoeven. A fan of Philip K. Dick's, author of "We Can Remember it For You Wholesale", the short story upon which the film was based, Cronenberg related in the 1992 biography/overview of his work, Cronenberg on Cronenberg, that his dissatisfaction with what he envisioned the film to be and what it ended up being pained him so greatly that for a time, he suffered a migraine just thinking about it, akin to a needle piercing his eye.

In the late 1990s, Cronenberg was announced as director of a sequel to another Verhoeven film, Basic Instinct (1992), but this also fell through. His thriller A History of Violence (2005) is one of his highest budgeted and most accessible to date. He has said that the decision to direct it was influenced by his having had to defer some of his salary on the low-budgeted Spider (2002), but it was one of his most critically acclaimed films to date, along with Eastern Promises (2007), a film about the struggle of one man to gain power in the Russian Mafia.

Cronenberg has collaborated with composer Howard Shore on all of his films since The Brood (1979), (see List of film director and composer collaborations) with the exception of The Dead Zone (1983), which was scored by Michael Kamen. Other regular collaborators include actor Robert Silverman, art director Carol Spier (also his sister) sound editor Bryan Day, film editor Ronald Sanders, his sister, costume designer Denise Cronenberg, and, from 1979 until 1988, cinematographer Mark Irwin. In 2008, Cronenberg directed Howard Shore's first opera, The Fly.

Since Dead Ringers (1988), Cronenberg has worked with cinematographer Peter Suschitzky on each of his films (see List of film director and cinematographer collaborations). Suschitzky was the director of photography for The Empire Strikes Back (1980), and Cronenberg remarked that Suschitzky's work in that film "was the only one of those movies that actually looked good", which was a motivating factor to work with him on Dead Ringers.

Although Cronenberg has worked with a number of Hollywood stars, he remains a staunchly Canadian filmmaker, with nearly all of his films (including major studio vehicles The Dead Zone and The Fly) having been filmed in his home province Ontario. Notable exceptions include M. Butterfly (1993), most of which was shot in China, Spider, and Eastern Promises (2007), which were both filmed primarily in England, and A Dangerous Method (2011), which was filmed in Germany and Austria. Rabid and Shivers were shot in and around Montreal. Most of his films have been at least partially financed by Telefilm Canada, and Cronenberg, a vocal supporter of government-backed film projects, has said: "Every country needs [a system of government grants] to have a national cinema in the face of Hollywood".

Cronenberg has also appeared as an actor in other directors' films. Most of his roles are cameo appearances, as in the films Into the Night (1985), Blood and Donuts (1995), To Die For (1995), and Jason X (2002) and the television series Alias, but on occasion he has played major roles, as in Nightbreed (1990) and Last Night (1998). He has not had major roles in any of his own films, but he did put in a brief appearance as a gynecologist in The Fly; he can also be glimpsed among the sex-crazed hordes in Shivers; he can be heard as an unseen car-pound attendant in Crash; his hands can be glimpsed in eXistenZ (1999); and he appeared as a stand-in for James Woods in Videodrome for shots in which Woods' character wore a helmet that covered his head.

In 2008, Cronenberg realized two extra-cinematographic projects: the exhibition Chromosomes at the Rome Film Fest, and the opera The Fly at the LaOpera in Los Angeles and Theatre Châtelet in Paris. In July 2010, Cronenberg completed production on A Dangerous Method (2011), an adaptation of Christopher Hampton's play The Talking Cure, starring Keira Knightley, Michael Fassbender, Vincent Cassel, and frequent collaborator Viggo Mortensen. The film was produced by independent British producer Jeremy Thomas.

In 2012, his film Cosmopolis competed for the Palme d'Or at the 2012 Cannes Film Festival.

In the October 2011 edition of Rue Morgue, Cronenberg stated that he has written a companion piece to his 1986 remake of The Fly, which he would like to direct if given the chance. He has stated that it is not a traditional sequel, but rather a "parallel story".

For a time it appeared that, as Eastern Promises producer Paul Webster told Screen International, a sequel is in the works that would reunite the key team of Cronenberg, Steven Knight, and Viggo Mortensen. The film was to be made by Webster's new production company Shoebox Films in collaboration with Focus Features, and shot in early 2013. However, in 2012, Cronenberg commented that the Eastern Promises sequel had fallen through due to budget disagreement with Focus Features.

Filming for Cronenberg's next film, a satire drama entitled Maps to the Stars (2014)—with Julianne Moore, Mia Wasikowska, John Cusack, and Robert Pattinson—began on July 8, 2013, in Toronto, Ontario and Los Angeles. This was the first time Cronenberg filmed in the United States.

On June 26, 2014, Cronenberg's short film The Nest was published on YouTube. The film was commissioned for "David Cronenberg – The Exhibition" at EYE Film Institute in Amsterdam and was available on YouTube for the duration of the exhibition, until September 14, 2014. Also in 2014, Cronenberg published his first novel, Consumed.

In a May 2016 interview, Viggo Mortensen revealed that Cronenberg is considering retiring due to difficulty financing his film projects. In February 2021 however, Mortensen said Cronenberg had refined an older script he'd written and hopes to film it with Mortensen that summer. He further hinted that it is a "strange film noir" and resembles Cronenberg's earlier body horror films. In April 2021, the title was revealed to be Crimes of the Future. It was shot in Greece during the summer of 2021, and competed for the Palme d'Or at the 2022 Cannes Film Festival.

Cronenberg appears as himself in the minute long short film, The Death of David Cronenberg, shot by his daughter Caitlin, which was released digitally on September 19, 2021.

Personal life
Cronenberg lives in Toronto. He married his first wife, Margaret Hindson, in 1972: their seven-year marriage ended in 1979 amidst personal and professional differences. They had one daughter, Cassandra Cronenberg. His second wife was film editor Carolyn Zeifman, to whom he was married until her death in 2017. The couple met on the set of Rabid while she was working as a production assistant. They have two children, Caitlin and Brandon. In the book Cronenberg on Cronenberg (1992), he revealed that The Brood was inspired by events that occurred during the unraveling of his first marriage, which caused both Cronenberg and his daughter Cassandra a great deal of turmoil. The character Nola Carveth, mother of the brood, is based on Cassandra's mother. Cronenberg said that he found the shooting of the climactic scene, in which Nola was strangled by her husband, to be "very satisfying".

In a September 2013 interview, Cronenberg revealed that Roman Catholic film director Martin Scorsese admitted to him that he was intrigued by Cronenberg's early work but was subsequently "terrified" to meet him in person. Cronenberg responded to Scorsese: "You're the guy who made Taxi Driver and you're afraid to meet me?" In the same interview, Cronenberg identified as an atheist. "Anytime I've tried to imagine squeezing myself into the box of any particular religion, I find it claustrophobic and oppressive," Cronenberg elaborated. "I think atheism is an acceptance of what is real." In the same interview, Cronenberg revealed that it depends on the "time of day" as to whether or not he is afraid of death. He further stated that he is not concerned about posthumous representations of his film work: "It wouldn't disturb me to think that my work would just sink beneath the waves without trace and that would be it. So what? It doesn't bother me."

In Cronenberg on Cronenberg, the director further elaborated that he was raised in a secular Jewish home, and while he and his family had no disdain towards any religion, such matters were not discussed. In the same book, Cronenberg said that in his teens he went through a phase where he wondered about the existence of God, but ultimately came to the conclusion that the God concept was developed to cope with the fear of death. In a 2007 interview, Cronenberg explained the role atheism plays in his work. He stated, "I'm interested in saying, 'Let us discuss the existential question. We are all going to die, that is the end of all consciousness. There is no afterlife. There is no God. Now what do we do.' That's the point where it starts getting interesting to me."

In Cronenberg's later films (e.g. A History of Violence, Eastern Promises and A Dangerous Method) openly religious characters become more common. During an interview for A History of Violence, Cronenberg even chose to identify as a materialist rather than an atheist, stating, "I’m not an atheist, but for me to turn away from any aspect of the human body to me is a philosophical betrayal. And there’s a lot of art and religion whose whole purpose is to turn away from the human body. I feel in my art that my mandate is to not do that."

In a separate 2013 interview, Cronenberg discussed the role religion plays in his films, using Eastern Promises as the main example:

I'm an atheist but not all my characters are atheists. So it's true that I don't think about God ever as part of my life or anything. But if you're a dramatist and you are working with characters who come from a particular culture, you have to accept their understanding of life, and with passion. So the Nikolai character, I'm pretty sure he believes in God and most of the other characters in the movie do too. Some of them are Muslim, some of them are Eastern Orthodox, and that's a part of their life, a part of their understanding of suffering. Because everybody in life suffers but not everybody thinks of that in religious terms. These people do. And they think of suffering as a way to salvation, also in religious terms. I am their God really, as I am creating them; that's religious in itself.  I am a very hardcore atheist believe me but you become like an actor really, as a director or a writer. You must take on the character as that character is and believe in it as you're playing it. To allow that character to exist as he would exist. That's really what it's all about, so I have no problem with characters who are religious and believe in God. I would have a problem if that was the point of the whole story because that bores me and I just don't have any emotional or intellectual respect for it, frankly.

Filmography

Films

Acting roles

Short films

Television

TV movies

TV series

Acting roles

Commercials

Awards and recognition 

Cronenberg has appeared on various "Greatest Director" lists. In 2004, Science Fiction magazine Strange Horizons named him the second greatest director in the history of the genre, ahead of better known directors such as Steven Spielberg, James Cameron, Jean-Luc Godard, and Ridley Scott. In the same year, The Guardian listed him 9th on their list of "The world's 40 best directors". In 2007, Total Film named him as the 17th greatest director of all-time. Film professor Charles Derry, in his overview of the horror genre Dark Dreams, called the director one of the most important in his field, and that "no discussion of contemporary horror film can conclude without reference to the films of David Cronenberg."

Cronenberg received the Special Jury Prize at the 1996 Cannes Film Festival for Crash. In 1999, he was inducted onto Canada's Walk of Fame, awarded the Silver Bear Award at the 49th Berlin International Film Festival. and that November received the Governor General's Performing Arts Award, Canada's highest honour in the performing arts.

In 2002, he was made an Officer of the Order of Canada, and was promoted to Companion of the Order of Canada (the order's highest rank) in 2014. In 2006 he was awarded the Cannes Film Festival's lifetime achievement award, the Carrosse d'Or. In 2009 Cronenberg received the Légion d'honneur from the government of France. The following year Cronenberg was named an honorary patron of the University Philosophical Society, Trinity College Dublin. In 2012, he received the Queen Elizabeth II Diamond Jubilee Medal.

The opening of the "David Cronenberg: Evolution" Toronto International Film Festival (TIFF) exhibition occurred on October 30, 2013. Held at the TIFF Bell Lightbox venue, the exhibition paid tribute to the director's entire filmmaking career and the festival's promotional material referred to Cronenberg as "one of Canada's most prolific and iconic filmmakers". The exhibition was shown internationally following the conclusion of the TIFF showing on January 19, 2014.

In 2014, he was made a Member of the Order of Ontario in recognition for being "Canada's most celebrated internationally acclaimed filmmaker".

In April 2018, it was announced that Cronenberg would receive the honorary Golden Lion at the 75th Venice International Film Festival.

British Academy Film Awards

Berlin International Film Festival

Cannes Film Festival

Academy of Canadian Cinema and Television
Best Picture

Best Director

Best Screenplay

Saturn Awards

Writings

References

Further reading

External links

 
 The Literary Adaptations of David Cronenberg (via LitReactor, 2011)
 David Cronenberg Bibliography (via UC Berkeley)
 David Cronenberg Profile by The New York Times Magazine (September 2005)
 Teleplay episode "The Italian Machine" online at the Channel4 website (RealMedia)

1943 births
Living people
20th-century Canadian male actors
21st-century Canadian male actors
20th-century Canadian male writers
21st-century Canadian male writers
20th-century Canadian screenwriters
21st-century Canadian screenwriters
Advertising directors
Best Director Genie and Canadian Screen Award winners
Best Screenplay Genie and Canadian Screen Award winners
Canadian atheists
Canadian experimental filmmakers
Canadian male film actors
Canadian male screenwriters
Canadian male television actors
Canadian male voice actors
Canadian people of American descent
Canadian people of Lithuanian-Jewish descent
Canadian surrealist artists
Critics of religions
Companions of the Order of Canada
English-language film directors
Film directors from Toronto
Governor General's Performing Arts Award winners
Horror film directors
Jewish atheists
Jewish Canadian filmmakers
Jewish Canadian male actors
Male actors from Toronto
Members of the Order of Ontario
Postmodernist filmmakers
Recipients of the Legion of Honour
Science fiction film directors
University of Toronto alumni
Writers from Toronto